Bad Axe is a studio album by Son Seals, released through Alligator Records in 1984. It won the 1985 W.C. Handy Award for best contemporary blues album.

Production
The album was produced by Son Seals and Bruce Iglauer. It was recorded at Streeterville Studios, in Chicago, Illinois.

Critical reception
Robert Christgau wrote that Seals "doesn't stand still—this time he's singing tenderly enough to bring off the self-servingly sentimental 'I Can Count on My Blues'." The Globe and Mail thought that "Seals' marvellously sure-fingered lead runs and warm voice are in fine shape."

Track listing
"Don't Pick Me For Your Fool" – 3:46
"Going Home" – 3:12
"Just About To Lose Your Clown" – 3:12
"Friday Again" – 3:50
"Cold Blood" – 3:10
"Out Of My Way" – 3:35
"I Think You're Fooling Me" – 3:52
"I Can Count On My Blues" – 6:08
"Can't Stand To See Her Cry" – 4:03
"Person To Person" – 3:12

References

1984 albums
Son Seals albums
Albums produced by Bruce Iglauer
Alligator Records albums